The Space Gods Revealed: A Close Look At The Theories of Erich von Däniken is a book written in 1976 by Ronald Story, with an introduction by Carl Sagan. It was written as a refutation to the theories and evidence in Erich von Däniken's most famous work, Chariots of the Gods?, almost page by page.

The book was reviewed by R.Z. Sheppard in Time magazine, describing Story's book as "a coherent and much-needed refutation of Von Däniken's theories".

Release details
 The Space Gods Revealed –  (hardback),  (paperback).

See also
 Raëlism
 Ancient astronauts

References

1976 non-fiction books
Ancient astronaut speculation
Books about extraterrestrial life
Scientific skepticism mass media